On My Radio may refer to:

 "On My Radio" (song), a 1979 single by The Selecter
 OnMyRadio, a 2008 album by Musiq Soulchild